Watanabe Akira (Japanese 渡辺 暁 (born 1972) is a Japanese political scientist, and chess player. In 2020, he was an associate professor at Tokyo Institute of Technology. He was born in Tokyo and his research focuses on Mexican politics and Latin American culture and politics

Profile 
He learnt chess in elementary school becoming serious at when he was a high school students. After graduating from Tokyo University, he studied in Mexico. At the same time he was given a FIDE rating, and in 1997 he obtained the ranking of FIDE Master 

His rating in Japan, as of December 2019 was 2284, ninth in Japan, second is Shogi player Yoshiharu Habu, and the seventh place is also a Shogi player Toshiyuki Moriuchi. Watanabe is sometimes confused with Akira Watanabe a shogi player who has the same surname and the same reading of the name in English characters. The rank of Japan Chess Association is certified as sixth dan. Watanabe's favorite tactics are the Sicilian Defense and King's Indian Defense.

In the field of Latin American research, he became an associate professor at Yamanashi University from April 2012, as well as, University of Tokyo. He is a part-time lecturer in Spanish at Keio University and Surugadai University. He transferred to Tokyo Institute of Technology from 2020 and continues to work as a part-time lecturer at other universities.

Titles 
 All Japan junior champion – 1990, 1991
 All Japan school champion – 1992, 1993
 Japanese Chess Championship – 1999, 2000, 2001
 Japan League champion – 1998, 1999, 2002
 Japan rapid champion – 1992

Publications 
 Chess, start from here
 Akira Watanabe's Chess course learn strategy and how to think 24 Lessons
 Easy even for beginners, introduction to illustrated chess

Co-translation 
 Under the volcano (with Malcolm Lowry)

References

External links 
 山梨大学研究者総覧 - 渡辺暁
 International Chess Federation
 Japanese Chess organisation
 Open Your Eyes!!

Living people
1972 births
Japanese political scientists
Japanese chess players
University of Tokyo alumni